Contrasts may refer to:
 Contrasts (Aziza Mustafa Zadeh album), 2006
 Contrasts (Bucky Pizzarelli & John Pizzarelli album), 1999
 Contrasts (Sam Rivers album), 1979
 Contrasts (Larry Young album), 1967
 Contrasts (Erroll Garner album), 1955
 Contrasts (Bartók), a chamber music composition

See also
 Contrast (disambiguation)